Ward Kirby Horton (born January 14, 1976) is an American actor and stunt person. He is known for playing John Form in Annabelle. In the fall of 2018, he played Ed in a Broadway revival of Torch Song Trilogy. Ward Horton is in the new HBO show The Gilded Age as Charles Fane.

Filmography

Film

Television

Theatre

References

External links
 
 
 

1976 births
21st-century American male actors
American male film actors
American male television actors
Living people
Male actors from New Jersey
People from Morristown, New Jersey
Wake Forest University alumni